Popovka is a rural locality (a selo) in Popovskoye Rural Settlement, Bogucharsky District, Voronezh Oblast, Russia. The population was 399 as of 2010. There are 4 streets.

Geography 
Popovka is located on the right bank of the Bogucharka River, 9 km southwest of Boguchar (the district's administrative centre) by road. Vervekovka is the nearest rural locality.

References 

Rural localities in Bogucharsky District